The 2016 Alabama Crimson Tide baseball team represents the University of Alabama in the 2016 NCAA Division I baseball season. The Crimson Tide plays their home games in Sewell–Thomas Stadium.

Personnel

Returning starters

Roster

Coaching staff

Schedule and results

! style="background:#FFF;color:#8b0000;"|Regular Season
|- valign="top" 

|- bgcolor="#ccffcc"
| Feb. 19 ||#28  ||  ||Sewell–Thomas Stadium || 3–1 || J. Keller (1–0)  ||  M. Shawaryn (0–1) || T. Burrows (1)  ||SECN+ || 5,867|| 1–0||–
|- bgcolor="#ffbbbb"
| Feb. 20 ||#28 Maryland ||  ||Sewell–Thomas Stadium ||5–9 ||T. Bloom (1–0)  || J. Walters (0–1)  || R. Selmer (1) || SECN+|| 6,449|| 1–1||– 
|- bgcolor="#ccffcc"
| Feb. 21 ||#28 Maryland  ||  || Sewell–Thomas Stadium||5–1 ||  N. Eicholtz (1–0) ||B. Shaffer (0–1)  || T. Burrows (2)  ||SECN+ ||4,119 || 2–1||–
|- bgcolor="#ccffcc"
| Feb. 24 || || #30|| Sewell–Thomas Stadium || 13–1 || M. Oczypok (1-0) || M. Hanchar (0–1)  || None  ||  SECN+||3,210 || 3–1||–
|- bgcolor="#ccffcc"
| Feb. 26 || ||#30 || Sewell–Thomas Stadium ||2–1 ||M. Foster (1–0) ||Z. Muckenhirn (1–1) ||  None|| SECN+ ||3,863 || 4–1||–
|- bgcolor="#ccffcc"
| Feb. 27 || North Dakota||#30 || Sewell–Thomas Stadium ||5–2 ||J. Walters (1–1) ||B. DeGagne (1–1) ||  T. Burrows (3) || SECN+ ||4,699 || 5–1||–
|- bgcolor="#ccffcc"
| Feb. 28 ||North Dakota|| #30 || Sewell–Thomas Stadium ||6–1 ||D. Duarte (1–0) ||M. McNair (0–1) ||  None|| SECN+ ||4,243 || 6–1||–
|-

|- bgcolor="#ccffcc"
| Mar. 1||  || #22 ||Riddle–Pace Field ||2–1 || S. Finnerty (1–0)  ||  M. Skinner (0–1) || T. Burrows (4)  || || 3,243|| 7–1 ||–
|- bgcolor="#ccffcc"
| Mar. 4 ||  || #22 ||USA Baseball Complex ||4–0 || G. Bramblett (1–0)  ||  R. Smoyer (1–2) || None  || || 280|| 8–1 ||–
|- bgcolor="#ccffcc"
| Mar. 5 ||  || #22 ||USA Baseball Complex ||  8–4 || M. Oczypok (2–0) || D. Procopio (0–2)  || None  ||  ||169 || 9–1||–
|- bgcolor="#ffbbbb"
| Mar. 5 ||  || #22 ||USA Baseball Complex ||1–2 || E. Brabrand (1–0)|| D. Duarte (1–1)|| T. DeJuneas (2) ||  ||987 || 9–2||–
|- bgcolor="#ccffcc"
| Mar. 6||  || #22 ||USA Baseball Complex || 2–0 || K. Cameron (1–0)  || M. Ritchie (0–1) || None|| || 107|| 10–2||–
|- bgcolor="#bbbbbb"
| Mar. 10 ||#8  || #24||Sewell–Thomas Stadium || colspan=8 |Canceled
|- bgcolor="#ffbbbb"
| Mar. 11 || || #24||Sewell–Thomas Stadium || 1–3 || A. Lantrip (2–2) || M. Foster (1–1) || N. Hernandez (2)|| SECN+ || 3,100|| 10–3||–
|- bgcolor="#ffbbbb"
| Mar. 12 || Houston  || #24|| Sewell–Thomas Stadium || 2–3 ||S. Romero (2–0)  || J. Walters (0–2)  || N. Hernandez (3) || SECN+|| 3,158|| 10–4||– 
|- bgcolor="#ccffcc"
| Mar. 13 || Houston ||#24 ||Sewell–Thomas Stadium ||7–6 ||D. Duarte  (2–1)  || T. Cumbie (0–1) ||None  ||SECN+ ||3,543 || 11–4||–
|- bgcolor="#ffbbbb"
| Mar. 15 ||  || ||Pete Taylor Park ||2–9 ||  N. Johnson (1–0) ||M. Oczypok (2–1)  || None|| || 3,577|| 11–5||–
|- bgcolor="#ccffcc"
| Mar. 19 || #10  || ||Alex Box Stadium ||6–0 || G. Bramblett (2–0)  ||  A. Lange (2–1) || J. Keller (1)  ||SECN+  ||10,366|| 12–5 ||1–0
|- bgcolor="#ccffcc"
| Mar. 19 || #10 LSU   || ||Alex Box Stadium ||4–3 ||J. Walters (2–2) ||J. Poche (2–2) ||  M. Foster (1) || SECN+ ||10,806 || 13–5||2–0
|- bgcolor="#ffbbbb"
| Mar. 20 || #10 LSU || ||Alex Box Stadium ||5–7 ||C. Gilbert (2–1)  || K. Cameron (1–1)  || None || SECN+|| 10,376|| 13–6||2–1 
|- bgcolor="#ffbbbb"
| Mar. 22 ||  || #22||Regions Field || 0–8 ||  K. Davis (1–0) ||M. Oczypok (2–2)  || None|| || 3,525|| 13–7||–
|- bgcolor="#ccffcc"
| Mar. 25 || Tennessee|| #22||Sewell–Thomas Stadium|| 7–3 || G. Bramblett (3–0)  ||  Z. Warren (4–1) || D. Duarte (1)  ||SECN+  ||5,867|| 14–7 ||3–1
|- bgcolor="#ccffcc"
| Mar. 26 || Tennessee || #22||Sewell–Thomas Stadium ||11–3 || K. Cameron (2–1)  || A. Cox (2–2) || None|| SECN+ || 3,842|| 15–7||4–1
|- bgcolor="#ffbbbb"
| Mar. 26 || Tennessee || #22||Sewell–Thomas Stadium ||3–6 || Z. Reid (1–0) || M. Foster (1–2) || D. Vasquez (1)|| SECN|| 4,405|| 15–8||4–2
|- bgcolor="#ffbbbb"
| Mar. 29 || † || #25 ||Riverwalk Stadium ||1–10 || M. Mitchell (4–0) || J. Keller (1–1) || G. Cardenas (2)|| SECN|| 7,307|| 15–9||–
|- bgcolor="#ccffcc"
| Mar. 31 ||  ||#25 ||Foley Field ||  7–113 ||M. Foster (2–2) || B. Tucker (3–2) || T. Burrows (5)|| SECN|| 1,532|| 16–9||5–2
|-

|- bgcolor="#ffbbbb"
|April 1 ||  ||#25 ||Foley Field || 1–7 ||R. Tyler (3–1)  || J. Walters (2–3)  || None || SECN+|| 1,848|| 16–10||5–3 
|- bgcolor="#ffbbbb"
|April 2 || Georgia || #25||Foley Field || 4–12 ||C. Jones (4–1)  || N. Eicholtz (1–1)  || None || SECN|| 3,630|| 16–11||5–4 
|- bgcolor="#ccffcc"
|April 5 || || ||Sewell–Thomas Stadium || 8–5 || M. Foster (3–2) || P. McMahon (0–1) || T. Burrows (6) || SECN+ || 3,659 || 17–11 || –
|- bgcolor="#ccffcc"
|April 5|| Alcorn State || ||Sewell–Thomas Stadium || 8–07 || J. Hubbard (1–0) || R. Johnson (3–3) || None || SECN+ || 3,659 || 18–11 || –
|- bgcolor="#ffbbbb"
|April 8 || #13 || ||Cliff Hagan Stadium || 2–3 || Z. Brown (2–5) || G. Bramblett (3–1) || S. Hjelle (5) || SECN+ || 1,765 || 18–12 || 5–5
|- bgcolor="#ffbbbb"
|April 9 || #13 Kentucky|| ||Cliff Hagan Stadium|| 2–6 || S. Hjelle (2–0) || R. Castillo (0–1) || None || SECN+|| 1,918 || 18–13 || 5–6
|- bgcolor="#ccffcc"
|April 10 || #13 Kentucky|| ||Cliff Hagan Stadium|| 2–1 || N. Eicholtz (2–1) || K. Cody (3–2) || T. Burrows (7) ||SECN+ || 2,012 || 19–13 || 6–6
|- bgcolor="#ccffcc"
|April 12 |||| ||Sewell–Thomas Stadium|| 7–6 || M. Foster (4–2) || T. Lowery (0–3) || T. Burrows (8) || SECN+ || 3,545 || 20–13 || –
|- bgcolor="#ffbbbb"
|April 15 ||#15 Ole Miss|| ||Sewell–Thomas Stadium ||0–4 || B. Bramlett (6–2) || G. Bramblett (3–2) || W. Short (6) || SECN+ || 5,950 || 20–14 || 6–7
|- bgcolor="#ccffcc"
|April 16 ||#15 Ole Miss|| ||Sewell–Thomas Stadium || 2–0 || J. Walters (3–3)||D. Parkinson (1–1)    ||  T. Burrows (9) || SECN+|| 6,385|| 21–14||7–7 
|- bgcolor="#ccffcc"
|April 17 ||#15 Ole Miss|| ||Sewell–Thomas Stadium || 7–2 || N. Eicholtz (3–1) || A. Pagnozzi (5–2) || D. Durante (2) ||SECN+ || 6,354 || 22–14 || 8–7
|- bgcolor="#ccffcc"
|April 19 |||| ||Sewell–Thomas Stadium ||5–3 || J. Keller (2–1)  ||  C. Gill (2–2) || T. Burrows (10)  ||SECN+ || 3,473|| 23–14||–
|- bgcolor="#ffbbbb"
|April 20 ||#23 || ||Sewell–Thomas Stadium ||2–8 ||R. Bell (3–1)  || K. Cameron (2–2)  || None || SECN+|| 3,565|| 23–15||–
|- bgcolor="#ffbbbb"
|April 22 ||#5 Texas A&M|| ||Olsen Field ||3–4 || M. Ecker (3–2)|| D. Duarte (2–2)|| None || SECN+  ||5,905 || 23–16||8–8
|- bgcolor="#ccffcc"
|April 23 || #5 Texas A&M || ||Olsen Field||7–4 ||J. Walters (4–3) ||J. Vines (6–1) ||  None || SECN+ ||6,543 || 24–16||9–8
|- bgcolor="#ffbbbb"
|April 24 || #5 Texas A&M|| ||Olsen Field ||1–2 || A. Vinson (1–1) || M. Foster (4–3) || None || SECN+ || 5,936|| 24–17||9–9
|- bgcolor="#ffbbbb"
|April 26 || || ||Griffin Stadium ||2–3 || T. Widra (3–3) || S. Finnerty (1–1) || None || SECN+ || 1,917|| 24–18||–
|- bgcolor="#ffbbbb"
|April 28 ||#8 Mississippi St. || ||Sewell–Thomas Stadium||5–12 || D. Hudson (6–3) || G. Bramblett (3–3) || B. Smith (2) || ESPNU|| 4,064 || 24–19 || 9–10
|- bgcolor="#ccffcc"
|April 29 ||#8 Mississippi St. || ||Sewell–Thomas Stadium||4–3 || M. Foster (5–3) || R. Cyr (1–1) || None || SECN+ || – || 25–19 || 10–10
|- bgcolor="#ffbbbb"
|April 30 ||#8 Mississippi St. || ||Sewell–Thomas Stadium||1–2 ||K. Pilkington (2–1)  || N. Eicholtz (3–2)  || D. Brown (1) || SECN|| 6,644 || 25–20 ||10–11 
|-

|- bgcolor="#ccffcc"
|May 6 || ||Sewell–Thomas Stadium  || 6–2 || G. Bramblett (4–3)  ||  G. Klobosits (2–5) || M. Foster (2)  ||SECN+  || 6,196 || 26–20 ||11–11
|- bgcolor="#ccffcc"
|May 7 ||Auburn ||Sewell–Thomas Stadium|| 4–3(11) || T. Burrows (1–0)  ||  C. Mize (2–3) || None  ||SECN|| 6,324 || 27–20 ||12–11
|- bgcolor="#ffbbbb"
| May 8 || Auburn||Sewell–Thomas Stadium  ||1–8 ||B. Braymer  (4–4)  || N. Eicholtz (3–3)  || None || SECN|| 5,991 || 27–21 ||12–12 
|- bgcolor="#ccffcc"
|May 13 || Arkansas ||Baum Stadium || 8–6 || G. Bramblett (5–3)  ||  D. Taccolini (5–4) ||  T. Burrows (11) ||SECN+  || 8,329 || 28–21 ||13–12
|- bgcolor="#ccffcc"
|May 14 || Arkansas ||Baum Stadium || 10–4 ||J. Walters (5–3) ||K. McKinney (1–5) ||  None || SECN+ ||8,547 || 29–21||14–12
|- bgcolor="#ccffcc"
|May 15 || Arkansas ||Baum Stadium || 7–4 ||T. Burrows (2–0) ||J. Teague (3–4) ||  None || SECN+ ||7,128 || 30–21||15–12
|- bgcolor="#ccffcc"
|May 17 ||   ||Sewell–Thomas Stadium ||8–2  || C. Freeman (1–0) || C. Radcliff (3–4) || D. Duarte (3) || SECN+ || 3,548 || 31–21 || –
|- bgcolor="#ffbbbb"
|May 19 ||#6 S. Carolina  ||Sewell–Thomas Stadium|| 4–6 || R. Scott (4–1) || R. Castillo (0–2) || T. Johnson (7)|| SECN+|| 3,507|| 31–22 || 15–13
|- bgcolor="#ffbbbb"
|May 20 ||#6 S. Carolina ||Sewell–Thomas Stadium ||2–4 ||B. Webb (10–4)  || J. Walters (5–4)  || T. Johnson (8) || SECN+|| 3,842|| 31–23||15–14
|- bgcolor="#ffbbbb"
|May 21 ||#6 S. Carolina||Sewell–Thomas Stadium || 7–9 || T. Widener (4–2)|| D. Duarte (2–3)|| T. Johnson (9) || SECN+  ||4,308 || 31–24||15–15
|-

|-
! style="background:#FFF;color:#8B0000;"| Post-Season
|-

|- bgcolor="#ccffcc"
| May 24 || Kentucky ||Hoover Met || 5–2 || N. Eicholtz (4–3) || Z. Logue (3–2) || T. Burrows (12) || 7,287|| 32–24 || 1–0
|- bgcolor="#ffbbbb"
| May 25 ||#1 Mississippi St. || Hoover Met || 1–4 || Z. Houston (5–0) || G. Bramblett (5–4) || B. Smith (4) || 13,448 || 32–25 || 1–1
|- bgcolor="#ffbbbb"
| May 26 ||#6 Florida ||Hoover Met || 4–5 || N. Horvath (2–1) || T. Burrows (2–1) || S. Anderson (11) || 5,232 || 32–26 || 1–2
|-

|-
| Legend:       = Win       = Loss       = PostponementBold = Alabama team member
|-
| † Indicates the game does not count toward the 2016 Southeastern Conference standings.*Rankings are based on the team's current  ranking in the Collegiate Baseball poll.

Record vs. conference opponents

Honors and awards
 Chandler Taylor – SEC Freshman of the Week, March 21

Rankings

See also
 2016 Alabama Crimson Tide softball season

References

Alabama
Alabama Crimson Tide baseball seasons
Alabama Crimson Tide baseball